Leslie Amsterdam (17 July 1934 – 12 March 1999) was a Guyanese cricketer. He played in eight first-class matches for British Guiana from 1958 to 1965.

See also
 List of Guyanese representative cricketers

References

External links
 

1934 births
1999 deaths
Guyanese cricketers
Guyana cricketers